Whitemouth River Ecological Reserve is an ecological reserve located within the  Sandilands Provincial Forest, Manitoba, Canada. It was established in 1986 under the Manitoba Ecological Reserves Act.

See also
 List of ecological reserves in Manitoba
 List of protected areas of Manitoba
 Whitemouth Island Ecological Reserve

References

External links
 iNaturalist: Whitemouth River Ecological Reserve

Protected areas established in 1986
Ecological reserves of Manitoba
Nature reserves in Manitoba
Protected areas of Manitoba